Purple Onion may refer to:

 Red onion, a type of onion
 Purple Onion (album), a 2002 album by the Les Claypool Frog Brigade
 The Purple Onion, a nightclub in San Francisco, California, US
 The Purple Onion (Toronto), a 1960–1965 music venue in Toronto, Ontario, Canada